The following lists the Turkic Speaking States Heads of States Summits organized between 1992 and 2010. These summits were followed by the Turkic Council summits between 2011-2021 and as Organization of Turkic States summits since 2022.

1st summit 
The first Turkic Speaking States summit was held in Ankara, Turkey in October 30, 1992.

2nd summit 
The second Turkic Speaking States summit was held in Istanbul, Turkey in October 18, 1994.

3rd summit 
The third Turkic Speaking States summit was held in Bishkek, Kyrgyzstan in August 28, 1995.

4th summit 
The fourth Turkic Speaking States summit was held in Tashkent, Uzbekistan in October 21, 1996.

5th summit 
The fifth Turkic Speaking States summit was held in Astana, Kazakhstan in June 9, 1998.

6th summit 
The sixth Turkic Speaking States summit was held in Baku, Azerbaijan in April 8, 2000.

7th summit 
The seventh Turkic Speaking States summit was held in Istanbul, Turkey in April 26, 2001.

8th summit 
The eighth Turkic Speaking States summit was held in Antalya, Turkey in November 17, 2006.

9th summit 
The ninth Turkic Speaking States summit was held in Nakhchivan, Azerbaijan in October 3, 2009. The Nakhchivan Agreement signed for founding the Turkic Council.

10th summit 
The tenth and last Turkic Speaking States summit was held in Istanbul, Turkey in September 15, 2010. A consultative board of elders has been established.

References 

Organization of Turkic States